Karaj is the fourth largest city in Iran, being in close proximity of the capital Tehran. It is situated in the Central District of Karaj County, Alborz province, Iran, it serves as the capital of the county Although the county hosts a population around 1.97 million, as recorded in the 2016 census, most of the  county is rugged mountain. The urban area is the fourth-largest in Iran, after Tehran, Mashhad, and Isfahan. Eshtehard County and Fardis County were split off from Karaj County since the previous census.

At the National Census of 2006, Karaj had a population of 1,377,450 in 385,955 households. The latest census in 2016 counted 1,592,492 people in 508,420 households.

The earliest records of Karaj date back to the 30th century BC. The city was developed under the rule of the Safavid and Qajar dynasties and is home to historical buildings and memorials from those eras. This city has a unique climate due to access to natural resources such as many trees, rivers, and green plains. After Tehran, Karaj is the largest immigrant-friendly city in Iran, so it has been nicknamed "Little Iran."

History 

The area around Karaj has been inhabited for thousands of years, such as at the Bronze Age site of Tepe Khurvin and the Iron Age site of Kalak. However, the present-day city of Karaj is mostly the result of modern industrial development in the 20th century.

Historically, Karaj was mostly significant as a stage on the road between Tehran and Qazvin. In Safavid times, a stone bridge was built that served as the main crossing into the town. The large Shah-Abbasi Caravansary, located at the southeast of Towhid Square, was built in the same era, under the rule of Šāh Esmāil.

In 1810, the Qajar prince Soleyman Mirza built the Soleymaniyeh Palace at Kajar to serve as a summer resort. The palace had four towers and was surrounded by gardens, and its reception room featured a pair of paintings by Abdallah Khan Naqqashbandi. By 1860, however, the palace was described as abandoned and only used as a shelter for travelers. Naser al-Din Shah Qajar later renovated the palace. In 1917, a School of Farming was established on the site, replacing the earlier Mozaffari Agricultural School in Tehran. Later, Reza Shah Pahlavi granted it to the University of Tehran's new Faculty of Agriculture.

In the 1930s, plans were drawn up for a large industrial complex covering 216 hectares on the south side of the village. This "Industrial Model Town of Karaj" was intended to be the site of the country's first steel mills, capitalizing on easy access to water and coal from the Alborz. However, the construction equipment imported from Germany was seized by the British at the Suez Canal, and the planned complex was never built.

A major industrial complex, the first privately-owned one in Karaj, was built in the 1960s by Mohammad-Sadeq Fateh. This complex, called Shahrak-e Jahanshahr, included oil, tea, and textile factories as well as housing for the workers.

The Morvārid Palace was constructed in nearby Mehršahr district, during the Pahlavi era. It was designed by the Frank Lloyd Wright Foundation (Taliesin Associated Architects) on instructions from Shams Pahlavi, elder sister of Mohammad Reza Pahlavi. In this period it was a transit and industrial town.

Majority of the structure is now controlled by the Basij Organization, and some sections of it are open to public under the operation of Cultural Heritage Organization of Iran.

Other historical sites of the city include the Mausoleum of Šāhzāde Soleymān, Emāmzāde Rahmān, Emāmzāde Zeyd, and Palang Ābād e Eštehārd.

Geography

Regions 

The downtown of Karaj is usually referred to Karaj Square, located hundred of meters to the west of Karaj River and the old Karaj Bridge. The villages Hesārak, Gowhar Dašt, and Šahrak e Azimie are located in the northern Greater Karaj.

Meškin Dašt, a large agricultural area between Mehršahr and Fardis, is near Karaj.

The following table includes the major districts of the city:

Open space recreational areas of Karaj include Irānzamin Park, Pārk e Xānvāde, Tennis Park, Pārk e Mādar, Tāleqān Gardens, Kordān Gardens, Jahānšahr Gardens, Pardis e Golhā, and the Tulip Garden of Gačsār.

Climate 
The climate of Karaj is a bit cooler than Tehran's, and it receives 250 mm of rain annually (and like Tehran, the precipitation pattern is similar to those of Mediterranean climates). The Köppen-Geiger climate classification system classifies the city's climate as cold semi-arid (BSk).

Amir Kabir Dam and some other small lakes are based in Karaj. The city is a starting point for a drive along road forced north through the Alborz mountain to the Caspian Sea.

Demographics 

The majority of the residents of Karaj are Persians, with Azerbaijanis making up the second major ethno-linguistic group of the city. Kurds, Gilak, Tabari and Lurs include the other ethnicities among the population of Karaj.

Transport

Railway 
Karaj is connected by railway and highways to Tehran 40 km east and Qazvin 100 km northwest, and by commuter rail to the subway system of Tehran.

The city is served by an urban railway organization established on 21 December 2001. It is also served by the Karaj Metro Station which was established on 7 March 1999, and is located in the south-eastern Karaj, near Tehran–Qazvin Freeway.

Road 
The highway system of Karaj includes Tehran–Karaj Highway, Karaj Special Road, and the old road of Karaj (Fath Highway). Bākeri Expressway is one of the main north-to-south routes in west Tehran, which is connected to the Tehran–Karaj Highway. Tehran–Karaj Highway is one of the busiest sections in Iran with AADT of 217084. Karaj–Qazvin has an AADT of 79606.

The aerial transport of Karaj is served by the Payam International Airport, which was established in 1990, and was officially opened in 1997.

Bus 
Currently, the total number of buses in Karaj and the suburbs are 1,600 units. More than 80 lines serve citizens.

Preparing Alborz Card can reduce the cost of travel tickets.

Metro 
Karaj Metro is an efficient way to travel inside the city. One line connects west and east of the city (from Karaj Station to Golshahr Station). It continues eastward until Tehran. On its way to Tehran, it stops at Chitgar park and Azadi stadium. The second line of Karaj metro (north to south) is under construction.

Air 
Payam International Airport, is an international airport located in Karaj, 40 kilometers (25  mi) from Tehran, in the Alborz Province of Iran. The airport was established in 1990, but was not opened officially until 1997. Payam Aviation Services Co. operates the airport as part of Payam Special Economic Zone. Payam Air previously operated an airmail hub at the airport.
Currently, this airport and its special area are used for purposes such as cargo transit, commercial transportation, and goods mail in the development of the country's communication and information technology industries.

Economy 

The economic base of Karaj is its proximity to Tehran. It is due to the transportation of products between Tehran and the Caspian Sea. Chemicals, fertilizers and processed agricultural goods are also produced in the city.

Zowb Āhan, the avenue leading to an industrial plant, is located at the south of Ostandar Square. Zowb e Āhan or Zowb Āhan, literally "steel mill", was a contract between the Pahlavi government and a consortium from Nazi Germany. The establishment of the factory Zowb Āhan e Karaj was halted by the beginning of the Second World War, and it was never launched.

Šahrak-e Jahānšahr was the first modern private industrial and housing complex of Karaj, built in the 1960s. The factories Jahān Čit (textile factory), Rowqan Nabāti e Jahān (oil factory), and Čāy e Jahān (tea factory), were established at the complex. It is one of the largest industrial zones of the nation, with a 20% share of the national GDP.

The special economic zone of Payam, with an area about  within the territory of Payam International Airport, was established in Karaj for development of air cargo and postal transportation, cold store, and packing services, as well as perishable and time sensitive exports. It is the only SEZ in the region with the privilege of its own airline.

Education 

Educational and research centers of the city include:
 University of Tehran (Agriculture and Natural Resources College)
 Kharazmi University (Karaj Campus)
 Tehran University of Art (Karaj Campus)
 Payame Noor University (Karaj Center)
 Technical and Vocational University (Alborz Province)
 University of Applied Science and Technology (Alborz Province)
 Farhangian University (Alborz Province)
 Alborz University of Medical Sciences
 Islamic Azad University, Karaj Branch
 Razi Vaccine and Serum Research Institute 
 Agricultural Research, Education and Extension Organization
 Materials and Energy Research Center
 Standard Research Institute
 Nuclear Science and Technology Research Institute (Center of Agriculture and Nuclear Medicine)

Sports 

Karaj was formerly home of the Persian Gulf Pro League club, Saipa, for several years and this club won its first league championship in this city, however in 2014 the team relocated to Tehran. Currently the only professional football team in city is Oxin Alborz that play in the Azadegan League. The Home stadium of Oxin Alborz F.C. is Enghelab Stadium that located in Karaj Enghelab sport complex and has a capacity of 15,000 people.  The stadium held a match between Iran and Indonesia in June 2009. The stadium also held an international match, on May 1, 2012, where Iran's National Football team played Mozambique.

Saipa volleyball team lost to Kalleh in this stadium in 2011–12 and became the runner-up in the final match of the country's volleyball premier league. Saipa has won the runner-up title of Iran Super League seven times.

One of the international ski resorts of Iran The, Dizin ski resort, is located a few kilometers north-east of the city, in the Alborz. In Dizin, along with skiing facilities, there are tennis courtyards, a slope for skiing on turf, some altitudes for mountain climbing and walking as well as riding and some routes for cycling.
Karaj also has an international tennis complex which is used to training and tournaments. Jahanshahr International Tennis Complex is located in Bagh Fateh. This park has eight practice courts and one competition court with a capacity of 1,200 people. It is the only tennis complex in Iran that has covered courts.

Notable people

Academia and scholars 

 Saied Reza Ameli (b. 1961), a scholar of communication

Actors 
 Mehran Rajabi (b. 1962), actor
 Mehraneh Mahin Torabi (b. 1957), actress

Politicians and political activists 

 Armita Abbasi (born 2001), protester, arrested and assaulted
 Shadi Amin (b. 1964), political activist, researcher
Fatemeh Ajorlou (b. 1966), politician
Mahmoud Bahmani (b. 1947), politician

Writers 

 Hossein Sanapour (b. 1960), writer
 Saeed Kamali Dehghan (b. 1985), journalist

Athletes 
Ali Kiaei (b. 1987), futsal player
Milad Farahani (b. 1988), football player
Afshin Kazemi (b. 1986), futsal player
Ahmad Sanjari (b. 1960), football coach
Alireza Heidari (b. 1976), Olympic wrestler
Mehdi Mahdavi (b. 1984), volleyball player
Mojtaba Taghavi (b. 1968), football player
Leila Esfandyari (1970–2011), mountain climber
Ali Mohammadi (b. 1984), wrestler
Ebrahim Sadeghi (b. 1979), football player
Ebrahim Masoudi (b. 1982), futsal player
Reza Mohammadi (b. 1986), football player
Amin Manouchehri (b. 1986), football player
Rouhollah Dadashi (1982–2011), powerlifter
Mohammad Nosrati (b. 1981), football player
Farshad Falahatzadeh (b. 1967), football player

See also 

 Mehršahr
 Amir Kabir Dam
 Morvārid Palace

References

External links

 Karaj city portal 
 About Alborz province 
 Ministry of the Interior of Iran

 
Karaj County
Cities in Alborz Province
Iranian provincial capitals
Populated places in Karaj County
Populated places in Alborz Province